Freberg is a village in Norway.

Freberg may also refer to:
Donavan Freberg (born 1971), American photographer
Stan Freberg (1926 – 2015), American comedian